Sri Lanka Ports Authority (SLPA) is the state-owned operator of major commercial ports in Sri Lanka. Founded in 1979, SLPA currently operates ports in Colombo, Galle, Hambantota, Kankesanthurai, Oluvil, Point Pedro and Trincomalee. As of 31 March 2013 SLPA had a 3% stake in Colombo Dockyard.

History
The Sri Lanka Ports Authority Act No. 51 of 1979 established the SLPA by amalgamating Colombo Port Commission, Port (Cargo) Corporation and Port Tally and Protective Services Corporation. The purpose of SLPA was to develop, maintain, operate and provide port and other services in the ports of Colombo, Galle, Trincomalee and other "specified ports".

References

External links
 
 

Organisations based in Colombo
Port authorities
Ports Authority
Transport companies of Sri Lanka
Sri Lankan companies established in 1979
Transport companies established in 1979